Rhode is a surname. Notable people with the surname include:

Franz Rhode (died 1559), German printer of the 16th century
Kim Rhode (born 1979), three-time Olympic shooting champion
Paul Peter Rhode (1871–1945), Roman Catholic bishop
Robin Rhode, (born 1976), South-African artist

See also
Rhodes (surname)